{{Infobox company
| name = Access Bank PLC
| logo = 
| logo_size = 80
| type = Public
| traded_as = 
| key_people = Herbert WigweDr. Ajoritsedere Awosika, Chairperson
Group Managing Director Chief Executive Officer
| industry = Banking
| products = Loans, Credit Cards, Savings, Investments, Mortgages
| revenue =  US$1,419 million (NGN:514 billion) (Sept 2019)
| assets = US $25.5 billion (NGN: 10.055 trillion) (2021)
| num_employees = 28,121
| foundation = 1989
| location = 14/15, Prince Alaba Abiodun Oniru Road, Victoria Island, Lagos, Lagos State, Nigeria
| homepage = 
}}Access Bank plc, commonly known as Access Bank, is a Nigerian multinational commercial bank, owned by Access Bank Group. It is licensed by the Central Bank of Nigeria, the national banking regulator.

Originally a corporate bank, they expanded into personal and business banking in 2012. Access Bank and Diamond Bank merged on April 1, 2019. In conclusion of its merger with Diamond Bank, Access Bank unveiled its new logo, signalling the commencement of a new enlarged banking entity. The bank employs more than 28,000 people in 2021.

After the merger, with more than 42 million of customers, Access Bank plc became the largest bank in Africa by customer base, and the largest bank in Nigeria by asset.

Access Bank Group

 in addition to Nigeria, Access Bank plc has subsidiaries in Mozambique, Zambia, Congo, Sierra Leone, Rwanda, Gambia, Ghana, Kenya, South Africa, and in the United Kingdom. Access Bank Group also maintains representative offices in China, India, Lebanon and United Arab Emirates.

 African expansion 
In early 2021, Access Bank announced that it had identified eight new African countries for potential expansion, seeking to benefit from a continent-wide free trade agreement. The target markets are Morocco, Algeria, Egypt, Côte d'Ivoire, Senegal, Angola, Namibia and Ethiopia, which would extend the international presence of the bank to 18 countries. Access Bank''' is expected to establish offices in some countries and in others, should partner with existing banks and leverage its digital platforms to provide services to clients.

French and European expansion 
In July 2021, the French government manifested its will to strengthen its ties with Nigerian captains of industry including Herbert Wigwe, the group managing director of Access Bank, and announced that an agreement had been signed which would allow the group to settle in France. This agreement confirms the group's vision and desire to extend its influence and activities to all of France and gradually to all of Europe.

The opening of Access Bank in Paris will be managed by the group's London branch, headed by Britain's Jamie Simmonds. The new offices in France will focus on trade finance. The Nigerian bank is also considering embarking on investment and wealth management services.

Overview
Access Bank plc is a large financial-services provider. In June 2021, the bank had an asset base in excess of US $25,5 billion (NGN: 10,055 trillion), and shareholders' equity valued at approximately US$1.87 billion (NGN: 775 billion). (Note that US $1.00 = NGN 413 on 1 November 2021.)

History
The bank received its license from the Central Bank of Nigeria in 1989, and listed on the Nigerian Stock Exchange in 1998.

2002: Access Bank was taken over by a core of new management led by Aigboje Aig-Imoukhuede and Herbert Wigwe.
2005: Access Bank acquired Marina Bank and Capital Bank (formerly commercial bank Crédit Lyonnais Nigeria) by merger.
2007: Access Bank established a subsidiary in Banjul, The Gambia. This bank now has a head office and four branches, and the bank has pledged to open another four branches.
2008: Access Bank acquired 88% of the shares of Omnifinance Bank, which was established in 1996. It also acquired 90% of Banque Privée du Congo, which South African investors had established in 2002. Access Bank acquired 75% of the shares of Bancor SA, in Rwanda. Bancor had been established in 1995 and reorganized in 2001. In September, Access Bank opened a subsidiary in Freetown, Sierra Leone, and then in October, the bank opened subsidiaries in Lusaka, Zambia and in London, United Kingdom.
2008: Finbank (Burundi) joined the Access Bank network, but exited the group in 2014.
2011: Access Bank was in talks with the Central Bank of Nigeria to acquire Intercontinental Bank plc.
Intercontinental Bank became a subsidiary of Access Bank plc, which recapitalized the former and acquired a 75% majority interest in its stock.
The combined effect of the restoration of Net Asset Value (NAV) to zero by AMCON and N50billion capital injection by Access Bank plc is that Intercontinental Bank now operates as a well-capitalized bank, with shareholders funds of N50billion and Capital Adequacy Ratio (CAR) of 24%, well above the 10% regulatory threshold.
January 2012: Access Bank announced the conclusion of its acquisition of the former Intercontinental Bank, creating an expanded Access Bank, one of the largest four commercial banks in Nigeria with over 5.7 million customers, 309 branches and over 1,600 Automated Teller Machines (ATMs).
2012: The London High Court indicted former Managing Director of Intercontinental Bank Erastus Akingbola to refund over $1 billion to Access Bank.
2018: In December 2018, Access Bank PLC acquires Diamond Bank, the board of Diamond Bank announces that her merger with Access Bank Plc expected to be completed in first half of 2019.
2020: Access Bank acquires Kenya’s Transnational Bank, including 100 percent of shareholding and 28 branches around Kenya.
2020: In October, Access Bank receives regulatory approval to establish Access Bank Mozambique. Plans were also announced of the Group transforming into a Holding Company and entering South Africa.

Locations

The bank's headquarters is located at 14/15, Prince Alaba Abiodun Oniru Road, Victoria Island, Lagos, Lagos State, Nigeria in the city of Lagos, the most commercial city of Nigeria. The coordinates of the bank's headquarters are: 6.4333751, 3.4453135.

See also

 List of banks in Nigeria
 Access Bank Group
 Intercontinental Bank

References

External links
Access Bank Plc

Banks of Nigeria
Access Bank Group
Companies listed on the Nigerian Stock Exchange
Banks established in 1989
Victoria Island, Lagos
Companies based in Lagos
2013 mergers and acquisitions
2019 mergers and acquisitions
Nigerian companies established in 1989